"Blind Leading the Blind" is a song by English rock band Mumford & Sons. It was released as a single on 21 October 2019. The song was written by Marcus Mumford, Winston Marshall, Ben Lovett and Ted Dwane.

Background
The band originally debuted “Blind Leading The Blind” live in 2016 and initially recorded the song during their Delta studio sessions, produced by Paul Epworth at The Church Studios in London. 

From the press release for the single - "Blind Leading The Blind" is a song that the band have been working on, re-shaping, re-writing and generally re-imagining over the last eighteen months. It was the band’s recent awarding of the prestigious John Steinbeck Award at San Jose State University in September that helped give renewed focus, inadvertently allowing them to finish the song and present it today. "Blind Leading The Blind" touches on subjects pertinent to Steinbeck’s extended literary works, but primarily the notion of community. Marcus Mumford, a self-proclaimed studier of this great American author, noted that his work with the people involved in the Grenfell Tower tragedy, as an ambassador for War Child UK and Children In Conflict US, and, broader-still, the band’s formation and undertaking of the Gentlemen of the Road fund, inspired the lyrics of the song, and those lyrics loosely reflected those themes, noted above, and ever-present to Steinbeck’s writing. Marcus Mumford: “Blind Leading The Blind has been a song we’ve had up our sleeves for some time, which ended up being a catalytic song for much of our work on Delta, its themes and feelings, but that we never got round to finishing in time to put it on the original release." “We’re proud that we’ve finally finished it, as it feels like one of the most challenging songs, thematically, that we’ve put out there, both for ourselves and our audience. It feels it’s becoming harder and harder to coerce yourself into a listening, present and unafraid disposition, but that’s the gauntlet we’re throwing down for ourselves.”   

American author John Steinbeck’s work is a common influence for the band. The band’s songs “Dust Bowl Dance,” “Timshel,” and “Rose of Sharon” also reflect on Steinbeck’s works.

Music video
The "Blind Leading The Blind (Live From Austin City Limits)" music video was shot at Austin City Limits Music Festival Weekend One on 6 Aug 2019 and released on 25 Oct 2019. Another music video was released onto YouTube on 6 December 2019. Both videos were directed by Nick Davies, a previous collaborator of the band. Marcus Mumford said “Working with Nick Davies made the process of making this an absolute privilege. Given our long history of work together, it was a complete joy to be under his direction again. We wanted to access the nature of the song, including some of its anger, introspection and even self-flagellation. A drum kit and an old sweaty laundry in Bangkok while on tour provided all we needed.

Charts

Weekly charts

Year-end charts

Release history

References

2019 songs
Mumford & Sons songs
Songs written by Marcus Mumford
Songs written by Winston Marshall
Songs written by Ben Lovett (British musician)
Songs written by Ted Dwane